Visekongene is a band from Bergen, Norway. Their music can generally be defined as progressive rock, but they also mix in elements from metal, jazz, rock, pop,  Children's music, old school Video game music and many other musical styles. Founded in 2001 by Fredrik Moltu "IPF" Johnsen (keyboards and vocals), Jon Are Sundland (keyboards and vocals), Erik "Satosh" Faugstad (guitars and vocals), Tor Kristian Ervik (drums and vocals) and Morten Johannes "mortenjohs" Ervik (bass and vocals).

Erik replaced Morten and Jan Frode Haugseth ("Jafro") replaced Erik in April 2005.

The band in its entirety is also two thirds of the band écapito.

Discography

Albums

External links 
www.visekongene.org The official web page of Visekongene
Salig blanding fra Visekongene Bergens Tidende about «Visekongene 7:42»
Surrealister Review of album «Visekongene 7:42» in Bergens Tidende. 4 out of 6.
Småsublim slippefest!  Dagbladet describe the band as "Nietzsche meets the Children's television".
Surrealismens mestere  Studvest describe the band as "Masters of Surrealism".

Norwegian progressive rock groups
Musical groups established in 2001
2001 establishments in Norway
Musical groups from Bergen